The Policía Municipal de Madrid is the municipal police force of the city of Madrid.

History

The first written reference to an armed force under the protection of the city council named Alguacil, dates back to 1202.

The first city police force formed by the mayor of Madrid was founded in 1561, the same year as the establishment of the royal court in Madrid by Philip II. In 1743 the Alguacil enacted regulations describing the group's functions and duties.

In the past, the local police were primarily composed of military persons who were wounded during the war. For instance, in 1759 Charles III established the Milicia Urbana (English: urban militia), whose membership was made up of war veterans who could no longer serve in the army. In 1850, the Regulations of the Municipal Guard of Madrid were established. This new police force replaced the Alguacil in performing security services and fell under the jurisdiction of the city council. The character and role of the agency laid the foundation for the Madrid police as they exist today.

By this time the new body created begins to take shape and create new units like the Mounted Section in 1893 and Coach Service in 1914 that regulated traffic Cab drivers and the first cars circulating in the municipality. Prior also creates the Municipal Guard Academy in 1906 that amount to knowledge base and experience for would Guards.

In 1924 creates the Organic Regulations of Municipal Police which set out the duties and obligations of the members of this body. Two years before the Spanish Civil War that ravaged the country the municipal police force continues to grow and make the body section of Drivers in 1934.

A year after the civil war in 1940 on the principle of postwar body, growing and expanding its workforce by creating the Brigade Movement. It was not until eight years later when the body will undergo another reorganization of staff and services.

In 1952 he created the Cavalry Squadron called the Escuadrón de caballería, as has the monitoring mission of parks and gardens and protocol services, now they can be seen patrolling parks like the Retreat and the Heart of Madrid.

In 1961 he created the Municipal Police Academy in Madrid which was governed by its own rules and in which future police officers were trained in the legislature and prepared to be an active part of the body.

In Spain begin to change things, and the woman enters the body in 1972, by a selective process different from that of men. Created in 1972, the Fifth Joint Traffic Association which was commanded by commanders also female could see regulating traffic among other places in the Plaza de Cibeles. It was not until 1980 when the Association was incorporated in the template's body and become part of the bulk of their peers.

In 1978 Spain comes to democracy and its greatest exponent approval of the Constitution. The police become regulated in Article 104 attributing to the protection of the free exercise of the rights and freedoms of citizens and ensuring public safety. It is also called on the regularization of the Security Forces in a future Act, which would come in 1986 with the Law of Security Forces.

In the new model, police Police are attributed to basic principles of action that should be governed by. It is at this stage that the local police forces take more strength in the panorama of the state police, setting its powers and subjecting it to other police forces. It begins as a major process of modernization that expands and rejuvenates the template, and also gives it better material means.

In 1985 he created a new Organic Regulation of Municipal Police, but with the approval of the Law of Coordination of local police of the Community of Madrid, this has to be modified, approving the regulations of the Madrid Municipal Police in 1995.

Currently the future police officers and not dealt with in the Corps Academy, but with the rest of the local police in the Community of Madrid, enrolled his learning curve in the Local Police Academy of the Community of Madrid which is in the Road Tres Cantos.

Then you create the Center for Integrated Security and Emergency Training (CIFSE) in which members of the Madrid Municipal Police along with the rest of the Municipality Emergency Corps, may continue their education during his career in various fields in which instruct courses.

The current sidearm is the Heckler & Koch USP chambered in 9×19mm.

Units

Operating units are of two types: regional and specialized. Each of the 21 districts of Madrid has a Municipal Police Unit under the command of an officer.

The district units are primarily responsible for monitoring public spaces, preventing criminal acts, and carry out the duties of administrative policing and regulating the movement, with the assistance of mobility agents. All of them also have a group of tutors agents, dedicated to the protection of minors and ensure safety in schools, and Citizen Service Offices, which are collected and cater to the demands of the residents in safety. The different units are arranged in the sub-inspectorates district zone, which in turn are grouped into two Territorial inspections.

Inspection Operations Center includes several units, organized into sub-inspectorates, specializing in various issues of public safety. The Central Security units are support units and district units are also specialized in improving public safety, improved quality of life and living in the city by the mass control and assurance of public spaces.

The Central Sub-inspection of the Judicial Police coordinated all activities of the Municipal Police Force in the execution of the powers in the judicial police is mandated by laws and conventions in force, she owned the Judicial Coordination Unit attached to the Courts Instruction in Madrid and Central Research Unit to coordinate and support staff and technical research groups District Units. It also has a group specializing in security surveillance needed in different bus lines of the EMT.

Care Unit and Family Protection specializes in the prevention of domestic violence within families.

Support Unit and Coordination with the Community Education is a unit specializing in road safety education for schoolchildren, for which he teaches driver education at various levels of education, both compulsory and high school and college.

The Environmental Unit is responsible for surveillance to prevent attacks on the natural heritage of Madrid and in general to prevent environmental crime . Watch the great parks of Madrid, with a section cyclist and hybrid vehicles with lower emissions.

The Monitoring and Protection Unit is specifically responsible for the protection of the authorities of the corporation.

The Traffic Services Inspectorate is responsible for the actions of the Body in road safety. Among other issues, exercises the powers of the judicial police in traffic and instruct the crowded road accidents. It also makes proposals for changes to the management and road signs designed to improve flow and traffic safety in Madrid. It is also responsible for planning campaigns infringement control and improvement of road safety within the Road Safety Strategy for the City of Madrid and the protection of the authorities in their travels around the city and municipality.

Functions

The Local police forces have the following features:

 Protect local government authorities, and supervision or custody of their buildings and facilities.
 Order, signaling, and direct traffic in the urban area, in accordance with the provisions of traffic regulations.
 Instruct crowded by traffic accident within the city limits.
 Administrative Police, with regard to the ordinances, Bandos, and other provisions within the scope of municipal jurisdiction.
 Participate in the functions of the Judicial Police in the manner provided in Article 29.2 of this Act
 Rendering assistance in cases of accident, catastrophe or public calamity, participating, in the manner provided in the Laws, in the implementation of civil protection plans.
 Carry out preventive measures and any actions tend to prevent the commission of criminal acts within the framework of cooperation established in Safety Meetings.
 Monitoring public places and work with Forces of State Security and the Police of the autonomous communities in the protection of the demonstrations and the maintenance of order in large concentrations of people, when required to do so.
  Cooperate in the resolution of private disputes when requested to do so.

Ranks

Organization

The General Coordination of Security is responsible for organizing and directing the Municipal Police Unit, proposing and executing the plans of operation and purchase of equipment, review and updating thereof.

The General Security Coordination is formed, among other units in the Directorate General of Security and the Municipal Police.

The head of the Municipal Police Force is vested in its Chief Inspector and Inspections is organized, sub-inspectorates and Units.

Operating Units are of two types: territorial district and specialized. Each of the 21 districts of the capital has a comprehensive Municipal Police Unit under the command of an officer and a sergeant attached.
Income and Education

The Municipal Police is divided into two scales, and Technical Executive, to which any citizen who meets the requirements of the call can be accessed for overcoming the selection process. Through open competition, categories are accessed Police (executive level) and Police Officer (technical stop). Once admitted to the Corps, there are internal promotion examinations for promotion to other professional groups in the Municipal Police. To do this you must meet the qualification requirements and seniority required in each case and pass the selection tests established. To read the body must satisfy certain physical requirements and educational qualifications and pass the selection process established. This selection process is a competition in which applicants must pass a series of tests of psychological, physical, and knowledge of the subjects that make up the program. After the opposition stage applicants must pass a Selective Course and finally, for aspiring open-seating, an internship.

See also
BESCAM

Notes

References

External links

 RCRD Official website

Government of Madrid
Municipal law enforcement agencies of Spain